Bjørke is a village in the municipality of Volda, Møre og Romsdal, Norway. The village is located at the innermost part of the Hjørundfjorden, just south of the village of Leira. The village is home to Bjørke Church. The village of Bjørke lies in the Sunnmørsalpene mountains.

The Tussa hydroelectric power station is located at Bjørke. The lake up in the mountains is piped down to the power station which produces a lot of power for the area. The power station has provided a lot for the village including doctors and a swimming pool.

Bjørke is one of the oldest farm areas in the Hjørundfjord area. Graves found in Bjørke date back to about 600 AD.

Since 2014, Bjørke has been the location of Indiefjord, an indiepop festival, hosting such bands as The Spook School, Haiku Salut, The School and The Smittens.

Prior to 2020, the village and surrounding areas were part of Ørsta.

References

Villages in Møre og Romsdal
Volda